"6 Inch" is a song by American singer Beyoncé featuring Canadian singer the Weeknd from the former's sixth studio album Lemonade (2016). The song's original portions were written by the artists alongside DannyBoyStyles, Ben Billions, The-Dream, Belly, and Boots. Also credited as songwriters are Burt Bacharach and Hal David (for the sample of American soul musician Isaac Hayes' 1969 version of "Walk On By") and Avey Tare, Panda Bear, and Geologist of neo-psychedelic band Animal Collective (for an interpolation of their 2009 song "My Girls"). The song's music video is part of a one-hour film with the same title as its parent album, originally aired on HBO.

Background and recording
Music producer Ben "Billions" Diehl talked to Billboard about his work with great artists and mentioned that Beyoncé had already known of a song named "6 Inch" since 2013. According to Diehl, he, rapper Belly and producer DannyBoyStyles met in October of the same year to work on music. "Originally a Belly song with participation from French Montana," Diehl said. "We got a response that Beyoncé had liked and then we decided: we should continue working together, I think they get somewhere. It turns out you do not know when that day will come." When a singer released her surprise visual album in December 2013, Diehl was quick to check out a list of songs, but "6 Inch" was not there. "Everything went well," Diehl concludes. After three years, in 2016, the song finally came out on Beyoncé's sixth album, Lemonade, with a guest appearance from the Weeknd.

Commercial performance
After the release of Lemonade, "6 Inch" debuted on Billboard Hot 100 chart at number 18, becoming Beyoncé's twenty-sixth top 20 on the chart. "6 Inch" also entered on the Hot R&B/Hip-Hop songs chart at number ten, becoming Beyoncé's twenty-seventh top-ten single on the chart. In overseas charts, the song entered in digital charts in top five, including Greece and Sweden. As of June 2016, the song has sold 265,607 downloads in US.

Live performance
"6 Inch" was included on the set list of The Formation World Tour on the last show, on October 7, 2016, at New Jersey's MetLife Stadium with the singer performing the song while suspended upside down.

Charts

Weekly charts

Year-end charts

Certifications

References

2016 songs
Beyoncé songs
Songs written by Beyoncé
Song recordings produced by Beyoncé
Songs written by The-Dream
Songs written by the Weeknd
Songs with music by Burt Bacharach
Songs with lyrics by Hal David
Songs about prostitutes
Songs written by Belly (rapper)
Songs written by Ben Billions
Songs written by Boots (musician)